Nina Meurisse (born 14 November 1988) is a French actress.

Meurisse was ten years old when she had her first lead role in a film.

Selected filmography
 The King's Daughters as Lucie de Fontenelle (2000)
 Accomplices as Rebecca Legendre (2009)
 Léa as Sonia (2009)
 Under the Rainbow as Clémence (2013)
 I Am a Soldier as Audrey (2015)
 A Woman's Life as Rosalie (2016)
 Camille as Camille (2019)
 Petite Maman as Mother (2021)

Selected television
 The Frozen Dead as Diane Berg (2017)

References

External links

Living people
French film actresses
French television actresses
1988 births
Most Promising Actress Lumières Award winners